If Winter Comes is a 1923 American silent drama film directed by Harry Millarde and starring, in a breakout role, Percy Marmont. It was produced and distributed the Fox Film Corporation. It is based on a 1921 novel later turned into a play by A. S. M. Hutchinson and Basil Macdonald Hastings.

Plot summary

Cast

Preservation
With no prints of If Winter Comes located in any film archives, it is a lost film.

See also
 If Winter Comes (1947)
 1937 Fox vault fire

References

External links

 
 
 
 
 Jacket cover of novel, with still from the film

1923 films
American silent feature films
Fox Film films
Lost American films
American films based on plays
Films based on British novels
1923 drama films
Silent American drama films
American black-and-white films
Films directed by Harry F. Millarde
Films set in England
1923 lost films
Lost drama films
1920s American films